The 1987 Pacific Coast Athletic Association men's basketball tournament (now known as the Big West Conference men's basketball tournament) was held March 5–7 at The Forum in Inglewood, California.

Top-seeded, two-time defending champions UNLV defeated  in the final, 94–69, and captured their fourth PCAA/Big West championship (and fourth in five seasons). 

The Runnin' Rebels, in turn, received a bid to the 1987 NCAA tournament, where they advanced to the Final Four.

Format
The tournament field remained the same as 1986, with eight total teams. Again, only the top eight teams, out of ten, from the regular season standings qualified for the tournament.

All eight participating teams were placed into the first round, with teams seeded and paired based on regular-season records. After the first round, teams were re-seeded so the highest-remaining team was paired with the lowest-remaining time in one semifinal with the other two teams slotted into the other semifinal.

Bracket

References

Big West Conference men's basketball tournament
Tournament
Pacific Coast Athletic Association men's basketball tournament
Pacific Coast Athletic Association men's basketball tournament